The Netherlands Photo Museum (NFM) is a photography museum in Rotterdam, the Netherlands, that was founded in 1989.

The museum collection consists of many historical, social and cultural images from the 20th and 21st century, from the Netherlands and elsewhere. It has control over more than 150 archives (three million plus images) taken by Dutch photographers. The archives are stored in climate controlled film storage facilities.

It is located at the Wilhelminakade in the previous Holland America Line workshop building, also known as the Las Palmas building.

The Netherlands Photo Museum was founded under the name Nederlands Foto Archief. and was subsidised by the Dutch government. In 2003, it was reborn, through an endowment from Hein Wertheimer, a wealthy Dutch lawyer, and renamed to Nederlands Fotomuseum.

Visitors to the NFM may browse the museum’s library of 120000 digital images, watch short films or participate in educational activities. The museum has large exhibition rooms and a rotating display of Dutch history.

Present Exhibitions at the museum:

1) Gallery of Honor of Dutch Photography (99 images) (Permanent exhibition)

2) Starring Chas Gerretsen: retrospective look at his life and work

References

External links

1989 establishments in the Netherlands
Art museums established in 1989
Museums in Rotterdam
Photography museums and galleries in the Netherlands
20th-century architecture in the Netherlands